"Train, Train" is a song written by Zenon de Fleur (Hierowski) and released on their 1976 single "Train Train/Taking it Easy" by The Count Bishops. Although not significant in the charts, it was covered by Billy Bragg on his album Talking with the Taxman about Poetry.

References

1976 songs
1976 singles
Songs about trains
Song articles with missing songwriters